The 2008 United States Senate election in South Dakota was held on November 4, 2008. Primary elections were held on June 3, 2008. Incumbent Democratic U.S. Senator Tim Johnson won re-election to a third term. As of 2022, this election, along with the simultaneous House race, is the last time a Democrat won a statewide election in South Dakota.

Republican primary

Candidates 
 Joel Dykstra, South Dakota State Representative
 Charles Gonyo
 Sam Kephart

Results

General election

Candidates 
 Tim Johnson (D), incumbent U.S. Senator
 Joel Dykstra (R), South Dakota State Representative

Campaign 
Already a well-regarded figure, following health problems, Johnson became more popular. "South Dakota is a very kind state," Steve Jarding, a Harvard political scientist, said. "People were rooting for Tim—Democrats, Republicans, independents—they wanted him to be O.K." He was also seen a pragmatic moderate. He received endorsements from the Republican Mayor of Sioux Falls, Dave Munson, and the NRA. Dykstra argued that Johnson voted 80% of the time with U.S. Senator Barack Obama and 90% with U.S. Senator Harry Reid. In response, Johnson pointed out his votes on the confirmation of U.S. Supreme Court justices John Roberts/Samuel Alito, against flag burning, in favor for the Iraq War, Patriot Act, a ban on partial birth abortion, etc.

One of the other reasons why Johnson is popular is earmarks. Recent examples include $248,000 for the Dahl Arts Center in Rapid City, $11 million for Ellsworth Air Base, $400,000 for Rosebud Sioux Reservation, and $37 million for Mni Wiconi Rural Water System. Dykstra opposed earmarks, leading U.S. Senator Tom Coburn to campaign with him.

In August, Johnson visited 20 cities across the state. With nine reservations in the state, American Indians account for 10% of electorate. In 2002, Johnson carried 94% of the Oglala Sioux, the state's biggest tribe.

Predictions

Polling

Results 
Johnson easily won re-election to a third term, losing in only four counties.

See also 
 2008 United States Senate elections

References

External links 
 Elections & Voter Registration from the South Dakota Secretary of State
 U.S. Congress candidates for South Dakota at Project Vote Smart
 South Dakota, U.S. Senate from CQ Politics
 South Dakota U.S. Senate from OurCampaigns.com
 South Dakota Senate race from 2008 Race Tracker
 Dykstra (R) vs Johnson (D-i) graph of multiple polls from Pollster.com
 Official campaign websites
 Joel Dykstra, Republican nominee
 Tim Johnson, Democratic incumbent nominee

2008
South Dakota
United States Senate